Macromia annulata, the bronzed river cruiser, is a species of cruiser in the family of dragonflies known as Macromiidae.

The IUCN conservation status of Macromia annulata is "LC", least concern, with no immediate threat to the species' survival. The population is stable.

References

Macromiidae
Articles created by Qbugbot
Insects described in 1861